The surname Hasenfus (probably of German origin) may refer to:
 Eugene Hasenfus (born 1941), former Marine, allegedly employed by the CIA, survivor of crash of Corporate Air Services HPF821 in Nicaragua
 Joseph Louis Hasenfus (1913 – 1999), American canoeist
 Walter Martin Hasenfus (1916 –  1944), American canoeist

German-language surnames